The 1964 Iowa Hawkeyes football team represented the University of Iowa in the 1964 Big Ten Conference football season. Led by fourth-year head coach Jerry Burns, the Hawkeyes compiled an overall record of 3–6 with a mark of 1–5 in conference play, tying for ninth place in the Big Ten. The team played home games at Iowa Stadium in Iowa City, Iowa.

Schedule

References

Iowa
Iowa Hawkeyes football seasons
Iowa Hawkeyes football